Háje is a Prague Metro station and the terminus of Line C. It is named after a local neighborhood, whose name in English literally means groves. Háje station, along with the two stations preceding it, serve Jižní Město, the largest housing estate in the Czech Republic.

The station was opened on 7 November 1980 as the southern terminus of the extension from Kačerov and was formerly known as Kosmonautů (meaning [station of] the cosmonauts) until 1990.

References

Prague Metro stations
Railway stations opened in 1980
1980 establishments in Czechoslovakia
Háje (Prague)
Railway stations in the Czech Republic opened in the 20th century